The 14123/24 Pratapgarh–Kanpur Central Intercity Express is an Express  train belonging to Indian Railways North Central Railway zone that runs between Pratapgarh and  in India.

Coaches
The 14123 / 24 Pratapgarh–Kanpur Central Intercity Express has 12 general unreserved & two SLR (seating with luggage rake) coaches . It does not carry a pantry car coach.

As is customary with most train services in India, coach composition may be amended at the discretion of Indian Railways depending on demand.

Service

Routing

Traction
As the route is going to be electrified, a   based WDM-3A diesel locomotive pulls the train to its destination.

References

External links
14123 Intercity Express at India Rail Info
14124 Intercity Express at India Rail Info

Intercity Express (Indian Railways) trains
Trains from Kanpur
Transport in Pratapgarh, Uttar Pradesh